The 21st century in literature refers to world literature produced during the 21st century. The measure of years is, for the purpose of this article, literature written from (roughly) the year 2001 to the present.

 2001 – The Corrections by Jonathan Franzen; Seabiscuit: An American Legend by Laura Hillenbrand; Life of Pi by Yann Martel;    Nobel Prize: Vidiadhar Surajprasad Naipaul
 2002 – Atonement by Ian McEwan; Middlesex by Jeffrey Eugenides; Everything is Illuminated by Jonathan Safran Foer;   Nobel Prize: Imre Kertész
 2003 – The Da Vinci Code by Dan Brown; Roman Triptych (Meditation);   Nobel Prize: J. M. Coetzee
 2004 –   Nobel Prize:  Elfriede Jelinek
 2005 –   Nobel Prize: Harold Pinter
 2006 – The Road by Cormac McCarthy; Les Bienveillantes by Jonathan Littell; Against the Day by Thomas Pynchon;   Nobel Prize: Orhan Pamuk
 2007 – The Brief Wondrous Life of Oscar Wao by Junot Díaz; A Thousand Splendid Suns by Khaled Hosseini; On Chesil Beach by Ian McEwan;   Nobel Prize: Doris Lessing
 2008 –    Nobel Prize: J. M. G. Le Clézio
 2009 – The Humbling by Philip Roth; Wolf Hall by Hilary Mantel;   Nobel Prize: Herta Müller

2010s

 2010 | 2011 | 2012 | 2013 | 2014 | 2015 | 2016 | 2017 | 2018 | 2019

Nobel laureates: List of Nobel laureates in Literature

See also 
2000s in books
21st century#Literature
Electronic literature

References

 

pl:2013 w literaturze